Song of the Heart may refer to:

Kundiman ng Puso (Song of the Heart), a 1958 Filipino film
"The Song of the Heart", a 2006 song by the musician Prince
The Song of the Heart (film), a 1955 Italian film